Discrete dipole approximation (DDA), also known as coupled dipole approximation, is a method for computing scattering of radiation by particles of arbitrary shape and by periodic structures. Given a target of arbitrary geometry, one seeks to calculate its scattering and absorption properties by an approximation of the continuum target by a finite array of small polarizable dipoles. This technique is used in a variety of applications including nanophotonics, radar scattering, aerosol physics and astrophysics.

Basic concepts
The basic idea of the DDA was introduced in 1964 by DeVoe who applied it to study the optical properties of molecular aggregates; retardation effects were not included, so DeVoe's treatment was limited to aggregates that were small compared with the wavelength. The DDA, including retardation effects, was proposed in 1973 by  Purcell and Pennypacker
who used it to study interstellar dust grains. Simply stated, the DDA is an approximation of the continuum target by a finite array of polarizable points. The points acquire dipole moments in response to the local electric field. The dipoles interact with one another via their electric fields, so the DDA is also sometimes referred to as the coupled dipole approximation.

Nature provides the physical inspiration for the DDA - in 1909 Lorentz
showed that the dielectric properties of a substance could be directly related to the polarizabilities of the individual atoms of which it was composed, with a particularly simple and exact relationship, the Clausius-Mossotti relation (or Lorentz-Lorenz), when the atoms are located on a cubical lattice. We may expect that, just as a continuum representation of a solid is appropriate on length scales that are large compared with the interatomic spacing, an array of polarizable points can accurately approximate the response of a continuum target on length scales that are large compared with the interdipole separation.

For a finite array of point dipoles the scattering problem may be solved exactly, so the only approximation that is present in the DDA is the replacement of the continuum target by an array of N-point dipoles. The replacement requires specification of both the geometry (location of the dipoles) and the dipole polarizabilities. For monochromatic incident waves the self-consistent solution for the oscillating dipole moments may be found; from these the absorption and scattering cross sections are computed. If DDA solutions are obtained for two independent polarizations of the incident wave, then the complete amplitude scattering matrix can be determined.
Alternatively, the DDA can be derived from volume integral equation for the electric field. This highlights that the approximation of point dipoles is equivalent to that of discretizing the integral equation, and thus decreases with decreasing dipole size.

With the recognition that the polarizabilities may be tensors, the DDA can readily be applied to anisotropic materials. The extension of the DDA to treat materials with nonzero magnetic susceptibility is also straightforward, although for most applications magnetic effects are negligible.

Extensions
The method was improved by Draine, Flatau, and Goodman who applied fast Fourier transform to calculate convolution problem arising in the DDA which allowed to calculate scattering by large targets. They distributed discrete dipole approximation open source code DDSCAT.
There are now several DDA implementations, extensions to periodic targets and particles placed on or near a plane substrate. and comparisons with exact technique were published.
Other aspects such as the validity criteria of the discrete dipole approximation was published. The DDA was also extended to employ rectangular or cuboid dipoles  which is more efficient for highly oblate or prolate particles.

Discrete dipole approximation codes
There are reviews as well as published comparison of existing codes.
Most of the codes apply to arbitrary-shaped inhomogeneous nonmagnetic particles and particle systems in free space or homogeneous dielectric host medium. The calculated quantities typically include the Mueller matrices, integral cross-sections (extinction, absorption, and scattering), internal fields and angle-resolved scattered fields (phase function).

General-purpose open-source DDA codes
These codes typically use regular grids (cubical or rectangular cuboid), conjugate gradient method to solve large system of linear equations, and FFT-acceleration of the matrix-vector products which uses convolution theorem. Complexity of this approach is almost linear in number of dipoles for both time and memory.

Specialized DDA codes
These list include codes that do not qualify for the previous section. The reasons may include the following: source code is not available, FFT acceleration is absent or reduced, the code focuses on specific applications not allowing easy calculation of standard scattering quantities.

Gallery of shapes

See also
Computational electromagnetics
Mie theory
Finite-difference time-domain method
Method of moments (electromagnetics)

References

Computational science
Electrodynamics
Scattering
Scattering, absorption and radiative transfer (optics)
Computational electromagnetics